Şükran Albayrak (born 12 May 1982 in Kartal, İstanbul) is a Turkish TV presenter, sport hostess, and retired professional female basketball player.

Albayrak co-presents "Sport Center", a sports news program at the sportstv every weekday evening.

Sport achievements
Euro Cup Finalist 2004 Italy
Turkish Championship
Winners (4): 2002, 2003, 2004, 2006
Turkish Cup
Winners (5): 2000, 2001, 2004, 2005, 2006
Turkish Presidents Cup
Winners (4): 2000, 2001, 2004, 2005

See also
 Turkish women in sports

References

External links

1982 births
Living people
Basketball players from Istanbul
Turkish women's basketball players
Fenerbahçe women's basketball players
Turkish television presenters
Turkish women television presenters
Power forwards (basketball)